The Bundesstraße 51 (translates from German Federal road, abbreviated as B 51) runs from Bremen in south-west direction though Lower Saxony, North Rhine-Westphalia, Rhineland-Palatinate and Saarland, and ends at the French border in the town Kleinblittersdorf.

See also 
Transport in Germany

051
Roads in Lower Saxony
Roads in North Rhine-Westphalia
Roads in Rhineland-Palatinate
Roads in Saarland